Pidonia scripta is a species of beetle in the family Cerambycidae. It was described by John Lawrence LeConte in 1869.

References

Lepturinae
Beetles described in 1869